DWARF is a widely used, standardized debugging data format. DWARF was originally designed along with Executable and Linkable Format (ELF), although it is independent of object file formats. The name is a medieval fantasy complement to "ELF" that had no official meaning, although the backronym "Debugging With Arbitrary Record Formats" has since been proposed.

History 

The first version of DWARF proved to use excessive amounts of storage, and an incompatible successor, DWARF-2, superseded it and added various encoding schemes to reduce data size. DWARF did not immediately gain universal acceptance; for instance, when Sun Microsystems adopted ELF as part of their move to Solaris, they opted to continue using stabs, in an embedding known as "stabs-in-elf". Linux followed suit, and DWARF-2 did not become the default until the late 1990s.

The DWARF Workgroup of the Free Standards Group released DWARF version 3 in January 2006, adding (among other things) support for C++ namespaces, Fortran 90  data and additional compiler optimization techniques.

The DWARF committee published version 4 of DWARF, which offers "improved data compression, better description of optimized code, and support for new language features in C++", in 2010.

Version 5 of the DWARF format was published in February 2017. It "incorporates improvements in many areas: better data compression, separation of debugging data from executable files, improved description of macros and source files, faster searching for symbols, improved debugging of optimized code, as well as numerous improvements in functionality and performance."

Structure 

DWARF uses a data structure called a Debugging Information Entry (DIE) to represent each variable, type, procedure, etc. A DIE has a tag (e.g.) and attributes (key-value pairs). A DIE can have nested (child) DIEs, forming a tree structure. A DIE attribute can refer to another DIE anywhere in the tree—for instance, a DIE representing a variable would have a  entry pointing to the DIE describing the variable's type.

To save space, two large tables needed by symbolic debuggers are represented as byte-coded instructions for simple, special-purpose finite state machines. The Line Number Table, which maps code locations to source code locations and vice versa, also specifies which instructions are part of function prologues and epilogues. The Call Frame Information table allows debuggers to locate frames on the call stack.

Further reading 

Michael Eager, chair of the DWARF Standards Committee, has written an introduction to debugging formats and DWARF 3, Introduction to the DWARF Debugging Format.

References

External links 

 
 Libdwarf, a C library intended to simplify reading (and writing) applications using DWARF2, DWARF3.
 elfutils, another C library for ELF/DWARF file processing.
 How debuggers work: Part 3 - Debugging information
 Debugging formats DWARF and STAB

Debugging data formats